Made4tv is the 2011 second album released by duo Little Jackie on Coppola's Plush Moon Records label. Several of the songs on the album were produced by Michael Mangini, who had previously worked with Little Jackie's lead singer, Imani Coppola, on her debut album "Chupacabra." The album was released via BandCamp.

Critical reception

The album garnered positive reviews from music critics. PopMatters' review, penned by Nathan Wisnicki, praised the album, commenting that the album starts off slow "but the arrangements get zestier, the lyrics get much wittier, and the singing meets its backing with a real offhand charm"as the album progresses. Roz Smith, writing for The Aquarian, likened the music to that of Macy Gray and Amy Winehouse, stating that Coppola "adds a modern R&B and jazz flare" with her vocals.

The album was included on Soul Tracks' year-end list of best albums as an honorable mention.

Track list
Except where otherwise noted, all songs by Imani Coppola and Adam Pallin.
"Take Back the World" – 3:22
"31 Flavors" –  (Imani Coppola / Michael Mangini / Adam Pallin) – 3:08 
"No One Will Ever Know" –  (Imani Coppola / Michael Mangini / Adam Pallin) – 3:45
"Cock Block" – 3:39
"Time of Your Life" – 3:25
"Kiss Kiss Bang Bang" – 3:20
"21st Birthday Party" – 3:13
"Saturday" – 3:10
"The Pact" – 3:08
"Independently Mine" – 2:43
"Fairy Tale Ending" – 3:15
"Love Will Find Me" – 3:20
"We Got It" – 3:18 (free bonus track on http://littlejackie.bandcamp.com/)

Personnel
Imani Coppola - songwriter, lyricist, vocals
Adam Pallin - producer, instruments
Michael Mangini- producer on * 31 Flavors

References

External links

2011 albums
Little Jackie albums